Arnaldo Speroni degli Alvarotti (1727-1801) was an Italian Roman Catholic cleric, serving as bishop of Rovigo.

Biography
He was born in Padua, to the same family as the playwright Sperone Speroni. Arnaldo published a number of works:
Storia ecclesiastica (translation of Godeau's book; 1761, Venice) 
Vita del vescovo di Vence (1761 in quarto)
Ragionamenti sopra gli ordini minori e sacri (1783, Padua)
Adriensium episcoporum series historico-chronologica, monumentis illustrata(1788 in quarto)

References

1727 births
1801 deaths
18th-century Italian Roman Catholic bishops
19th-century Italian Roman Catholic bishops
18th-century Italian writers
18th-century Italian male writers
19th-century Italian writers
19th-century Italian male writers